Domestica may refer to:

Film
 Domestica (film), a film by Zakery Weiss, shown during the 2003 New York Underground Film Festival

Music 
 Domestica, a 2000 album by Cursive
 Symphonia Domestica, a tone poem by Richard Strauss
 "Lyra Domestica", a hymn by Friedrich Spitta
 "Violenza Domestica", a song by Mr. Bungle on the album Disco Volante

Places 
 Cala Domestica, a narrow  bay in the southwest of Sardinia

Sculpture 
 Lumia Domestica, a sculpture by Willie Williams

Species 
 Iris domestica, the leopard flower
 Nandina domestica, commonly known as heavenly bamboo or sacred bamboo
 Prunus domestica, a species of trees and shrubs commonly called "plums"
 Sorbus domestica, the service tree
 Tegenaria domestica, the barn funnel weaver spider
 Anas platyrhynchos domestica, the Pekin duck or Long Island duck
 Columba livia f. domestica, the domestic pigeon
 Cryphia domestica, the marbled beauty moth
 Lonchura striata domestica, the society finch or Bengalese finch
 Malus domestica, the apple tree
 Monodelphis domestica, the gray short-tailed opossum
 Musca domestica, the housefly
 Serinus canaria domestica, the domestic canary
 Thermobia domestica, the firebrat, a small insect
 Domestica, the taxonomic term

See also 
 Including use as a species name
 Domesticus (disambiguation)
 Domesticum (disambiguation)

Latin words and phrases